Ronald de Lugo (August 2, 1930 – July 14, 2020) was an American politician. He was the first Delegate from the United States Virgin Islands to the United States House of Representatives. Ron de Lugo's parents were Puerto Ricans. Mr. De Lugo's grandfather owned a hardware store and gun dealership in Charlotte Amalie, St. Thomas. Ron's parents were living in New Jersey at the time Ron was born and also lived in the Virgin Islands as civil servants. He was born in Englewood, New Jersey, and attended the Colegio San José, Puerto Rico. He served in the United States Army as a program director and announcer for the Armed Forces Radio Service. He worked at WSTA radio in St. Thomas and also at WIVI in St. Croix. He was a Virgin Islands territorial Senator, a Democratic National Committeeman, the administrator for St. Croix, the representative of the Virgin Islands to Washington, D.C., and a delegate to the Democratic National Conventions in 1956, 1960, 1964 and 1968.

De Lugo was elected as a Democratic Delegate to the United States House of Representatives, serving from January 3, 1973 to January 3, 1979.

De Lugo chose not to seek re-election to the U.S. House in 1978 in order to pursue a bid for Governor of the United States Virgin Islands. De Lugo challenged incumbent Democratic Governor Juan Francisco Luis in the 1978 gubernatorial election. He chose Eric E. Dawson, a Senator in the Legislature of the Virgin Islands, as his running mate for lieutenant governor. Governor Juan Luis defeated de Lugo in the gubernatorial general election on November 7, 1978. Gov. Luis and Lt. Henry Millin won 10,978 votes, or 59.2% of the total vote. De Lugo and Dawson placed second, garnering 7,568 votes, or 40.8%. Luis won all three of the U.S. Virgin Islands' main islands in the election.

He was elected to the House again, serving from January 3, 1981 to January 3, 1995. He was a resident of Saint Croix. De Lugo died on July 14, 2020, less than a month before his 90th birthday.

Legacy
The Ron de Lugo Federal Building and U.S. Courthouse on St. Thomas is named after him.

See also 
 List of Hispanic Americans in the United States Congress

References

External links

|-

|-

1930 births
2020 deaths
Colegio San José alumni
Delegates to the United States House of Representatives from the United States Virgin Islands
Democratic Party members of the United States House of Representatives from the United States Virgin Islands
Democratic Party of the Virgin Islands politicians
Hispanic and Latino American politicians
People from Englewood, New Jersey
People from Saint Croix, U.S. Virgin Islands
Military personnel from New Jersey
United States Virgin Islands military personnel
Senators of the Legislature of the United States Virgin Islands
American people of Puerto Rican descent